Nicole Forsgren Velasquez is an American technology executive, entrepreneur, and author.  In 2020 she was named vice-president of Research & Strategy at Microsoft's GitHub and more recently Partner at Microsoft Research. She is coauthor of Accelerate: The Science of Lean Software and DevOps which won the Shingo Research and Professional Publication Award in 2019.

Life and career
Forsgren was CEO and co-founder of DevOps Research and Assessment LLC (DORA) with Jez Humble and Gene Kim. DORA is known for the annual State of DevOps report, and their DevOps Scorecard. In 2018 DORA was purchased by Google.

References

External links 

 

1978 births
Living people
American bloggers
GitHub people
21st-century American businesswomen
21st-century American businesspeople